Zibelthiurdos is a Thracian god of heaven, lightning and rain, whose name is known mainly from epigraphic monuments. The only known reference to this god so far in ancient literature is in Cicero's speech against Pizon, where he is mentioned under the name Jovi Vrii (Iuppiter Urius). According to Cicero, Jupiter Urius had the most ancient and venerated of the barbarian temples, which was sacked by invading armies and resulted in diseases from which those afflicted never recovered.

There is not enough information to draw clear conclusions about his cult, worship, or functions. The preserved images give reason to connect Zibelthiurdos with the ancient Greek God Zeus the Thunderer; he is depicted holding a lightning bolt in his raised right hand, and to his right an eagle with wings spread out.

Names and epigraphy
In the epigraphic evidence, the deity's name is attested in 12 documents, alternatively written as Zbelthiourdes, Zbelthourdos, Zbelsourdos or Zbersurdos, Zbeltiurdus, Svelsurdus.

Orientalist Wilhelm Tomaschek reported three Thracian inscriptions:

 a dedication from Moesia made by a Mucaporis to a Διί Ζβελθιούρδῳ;
 an inscription in Skopia to a DEO ZBELTHIURDO;
 an inscription from Perinthus to a Διί Ζιβελσούρδῳ.

According to epigraphic evidence, the name of Greek god Zeus is found in Thracian inscriptions associated with Zbelthiurdos and variations: Zbelturd, Zbelsurd, Zbeltiurd, Zpelturd. This combination is believed to attest a syncretism between the Greek deity and a local Thracian god of thunder and lightning.

Etymology
His name speculatively means "Lightning Carrier" or "Thunderer", but it is uncertain whether Zibelthiurdos is his name or an epithet.

Tomaschek interpreted that Zibel- and Zbel- were the same word, although he believed the former to be the older form (cf. Thracian king Ζιβέλμιος, or ). He also derived Zbel- from a Proto-Indo-European stem *ģʰeib-. Further descendants would include Lithuanian žaibas "lightning", verb žibėti "to shine, to glow", and possibly Croatian zúblja "torch" and Slovene zubelj "flame".

Bulgarian linguist  indicated the word Zbel- is related to Latvian zibele "lightning".

Some scholars have suggested a relation between the Albanian deity name Shurdh and the second part of the theonym Zibelsurdus.

Cultic locales

Zibelthiurdos shrines have been found near the village of Golemo Selo in the Kyustendil Region – an area inhabited by the Thracian Dentellets tribe – as well as near Kapitan Dimitrievo village in the Pazardzhik Province. His image was discovered in a relief from the Esquiline Hill, where he is depicted along with Yambadula (or Iambadoule), a figure of an unclear nature.

Other uses
The Zbelsurd Glacier of Antarctica is named after the god.

See also
 Shurdhi

Citations

Bibliography

Further reading

 Georgieff, Dimitar (2017). "The mysterious goddess Iambadule and her consort god Sbelsurd". 10.13140/RG.2.2.10621.87524.
  [Popov, Dimitar]. "Збелсурд" [Sbelsurd]. In: Годишник на Софийския университет "Св. Кл. Охридски": Исторически факултет, специалност Етнология [ANNUAIRE DE L'UNIVERSITE DE SOFIA "ST. KLIMENT OHRIDSKI", FACULTE D'HISTOIRE – STUDIA ETHNOLOGICA]. Tom 2. София: Университетско издателство "Св. Кл. Охридски", 2012. pp. 113-120. .
 Archeology
 Dobruna-Salihu, Exhlale. "ALTARI I PABOTUAR I PERËNDISË ZBELTIURD NGA KOSOVA DHE PËRKUSHTIMET E TJERA NË DARDANI" [UNPUBLISHED ALTAR OF THE DIETY ZBELTIURD FROM KOSOVA AND OTHER DEVOTIONS IN DARDANIA]. In: Gjurmime Albanologjike – Seria e shkencave historike 41-42 (2011): 309-320. (In Albanian)

Thracian gods